Greg Hicks (born 27 May 1953) is an English actor. He completed theatrical training at Rose Bruford College and joined The Royal Shakespeare Company in 1976. He was nominated for a 2004 Laurence Olivier Theatre Award in the category "Best Actor of 2003" for his performance in Coriolanus at the Old Vic and was awarded the 2003 Critics' Circle Theatre Awards (Drama) for Best Shakespearian Performance in the same role.

Hicks has practised the Brazilian hybrid of martial arts and dance capoeira, as well as the Japanese dance-theatre form butoh. He has said that he started to explore the physicality associated with these disciplines in a masked production of Oresteia (1981), directed by his mentor at the National Theatre, Peter Hall. In 2016, he toured with Flute Theatre as Claudius in a production of Hamlet, who's there? written for interactive audiences.

Selected stage performances
 Royal Shakespeare Company:
 Julius Caesar (2001) as Brutus
 Merry Wives of Windsor (2002) as Dr Caius
 Coriolanus (2002) as Coriolanus
 Hamlet (2004) as Ghost/Player King/Gravedigger
 Macbeth (2004) as Macbeth
 Julius Caesar (2009) as Julius Caesar
 The Winter's Tale (2009) as Leontes
 King Lear (2010) as King Lear
 Hamlet (2013) as Claudius/Ghost
 All's Well That Ends Well (2013) as King of France
Other:
 Acastos at the National Theatre (1980)
 The Romans in Britain, as Marban, a druid, at the National Theatre (1980)
 The Oresteia, as Orestes, at the National Theatre and Epidavros, Greece (1982) and Channel 4 (1983)
Coriolanus, as Tullus Aufidius, National Theatre, (1984)
 The Homecoming, as Teddy, at the Comedy Theatre, London (1991)
 Messiah at the Old Vic (2002) as Christ
 Bacchai, as Dionysus, at the National Theatre (2003)
 Missing Persons: Four Tragedies and Roy Keane by Colin Teevan at the Jermyn Street Theatre (2006) as various characters
 Tamburlaine at the Barbican (2005) as Tamburlaine
 An Enemy of the People at the Arcola Theatre (2008) as Dr Thomas Stockmann
 In Blood: The Bacchae at the Arcola Theatre (2009)
 Clarion, Arcola Theatre, (2015)
 Hamlet, who's there? as Claudius, with Flute Theatre (2016)
Richard III (title role) Arcola (2017)

Partial filmography
Northanger Abbey 1987 (TV)
Fortunes of War 1987 (TV)
Bergerac (TV)
Maigret 1992 (TV)
Agatha Christie's Marple 2006 (TV)
Waking the Dead 2007 (TV)
Midsomer Murders 2011 (TV) 
Snow White & the Huntsman 2012
The Bible 2013 (TV)
Son of God 2014

References

External links

 Interview with Greg Hicks in The Guardian on playing Macbeth
 The Times on Greg Hicks' career and his role as Macbeth
 Greg Hicks at the Royal Shakespeare Company

1953 births
Alumni of Rose Bruford College
Critics' Circle Theatre Award winners
English male stage actors
Living people
People from Leicester
Royal Shakespeare Company members
English male Shakespearean actors
Male actors from Leicestershire